William Leonard Carter, R.E. (1877 – 4 July 1917) was a British businessman and army officer.

Early life 
He was born in Shanghai in 1877 was educated at St. Paul's School, London. He continued his studies in technical direction at the Central Technical College.

Carter served as a 2nd Lieutenant in the East Lancashire Regiment during the South African War. Later he moved to Hong Kong and joined the China and Japan Telephone Company as a local agent and manager for 13 years. He was keen on forming the Hong Kong Local Centre of the Institution and became the first Chairman of the Local Centre in 1915.

Army officer 
He became Adjutant of the Hong Kong Volunteer Reserves with the local rank of Captain during the First World War. He later resigned from the post and became the officer commanding of the Royal Engineers stores.

Death 
He died from enteric fever at the Military Hospital in Hong Kong on 4 July 1917. He was buried at the Hong Kong Cemetery.

References

1877 births
1917 deaths
British Army personnel of the Second Boer War
British expatriates in Hong Kong
British expatriates in China
People educated at St Paul's School, London
Hong Kong businesspeople
Businesspeople from Shanghai
19th-century British businesspeople
British Army personnel of World War I
British military personnel killed in World War I
Deaths from typhoid fever